Thenambakkam is a census town in Kancheepuram district in the Indian state of Tamil Nadu.

Thenambakkam old name Thenmaraiur.

Demographics
 India census, Thenambakkam had a population of 9257. Males constitute 51% of the population and females 49%. Thenambakkam has an average literacy rate of 65%, higher than the national average of 59.5%: male literacy is 73%, and female literacy is 57%. In Thenambakkam, 11% of the population is under 6 years of age. Thenambakkam Brahma pureeswarar temple was a favorite place of Kanchi Periyavaal (Pujyasri Chandrasekharendra Saraswathi ) of the famed Kanchi Kamakoti Peetam.

References

Cities and towns in Kanchipuram district